Events from the year 1386 in Ireland.

Incumbent
Lord: Richard II

Events
 March 8 – King Richard II of England grants John of Gaunt, 1st Duke of Lancaster, control of all royal lands in Ireland.

Births
 Thomas FitzGerald, 5th Earl of Desmond, born circa 1386

References